Manga Bible may refer to:

 The Manga Bible: From Genesis to Revelation, an English-language manga adaptation of the Bible created by Siku
 Manga Bible (series), a six volume manga series based on the Bible